The 1921–22 Yorkshire Cup was the fourteenth occasion on which the  Yorkshire Cup competition had been held. This year saw another new name on the  trophy when Leeds won the cup by beating Dewsbury by the score of 11-3 in the final. The match was played at Thrum Hall, Halifax, now in West Yorkshire. The attendance was 20,000 and receipts were £1,650. This was the first of Leeds' Yorkshire Cup successes, and they would go on to (eventually) triumph on a record seventeen occasions.

Background 

The Rugby Football League's Yorkshire Cup competition was a knock-out competition between (mainly professional) rugby league clubs from  the  county of Yorkshire. The actual area was at times increased to encompass other teams from  outside the  county such as Newcastle, Mansfield, Coventry, and even London (in the form of Acton & Willesden. The Rugby League season always (until the onset of "Summer Rugby" in 1996) ran from around August-time through to around May-time and this competition always took place early in the season, in the Autumn, with the final taking place in (or just before) December (The only exception to this was when disruption of the fixture list was caused during, and immediately after, the two World Wars).

Competition and results 

This season there were no junior/amateur clubs taking part,  no "leavers" but Featherstone Rovers joined for the  first time as a league team, after being newly admitted to the league during the close-season. This resulted in one additional entrant, bringing the total up to fourteen. This in turn resulted in only two byes in the first round.

Round 1 
Involved  6 matches (with two byes) and 14 clubs

Round 2 – quarterfinals 
Involved 4 matches and 8 clubs

Round 2 - replays  
Involved  1 match and 2 clubs

Round 3 – semifinals  
Involved 2 matches and 4 clubs

Final

Teams and scorers 

Scoring - Try = three (3) points - Goal = two (2) points - Drop goal = two (2) points

The road to success

Notes 
1 * Featherstone Rovers played their first Yorkshire Cup match since being elected to the league, and at  Post Office Road

2 * The  attendance is given as 22,001 by RUGBY LEAGUE project  but only 20,000 by the  Rothmans Rugby League Yearbook of 1991-92 and 1990-91

3 * Thrum Hall was the home ground of Halifax with a final capacity of 9,832 (The attendance record of 29,153 was set on 21 March 1959 for a third round Challenge Cup tie v  Wigan). The club finally moved out in 1998 to take part ownership and ground-share with Halifax Town FC at The Shay Stadium.

See also 
1921–22 Northern Rugby Football Union season
Rugby league county cups

References

External links
Saints Heritage Society
1896–97 Northern Rugby Football Union season at wigan.rlfans.com
Hull&Proud Fixtures & Results 1896/1897
Widnes Vikings - One team, one passion Season In Review - 1896-97
The Northern Union at warringtonwolves.org

RFL Yorkshire Cup
Yorkshire Cup